Notre-Dame-de-la-Paix (French for "Our Lady of Peace") is a town and municipality in the Outaouais region of Quebec, Canada, part of the Papineau Regional County Municipality.

History
In 1902, the municipality was formed out of sections of Notre-Dame-de-Bon-Secours and Saint-André-Avellin. Although it remains unclear what specific event is referred to in the name of this parish municipality, it followed the theme of municipal names in the Outaouais dedicated to the Virgin Mary, probably due to the Missionary Oblates of Mary Immaculate, who were missionaries and pastors throughout the region.

In October 2003, the Parish Municipality of Notre-Dame-de-la-Paix changed statutes and became the Municipality of Notre-Dame-de-la-Paix.

Demographics

Mother tongue:
 English as first language: 2.4%
 French as first language: 96.0%
 English and French as first language: 0%
 Other as first language: 0%

Education
Sir Wilfrid Laurier School Board operates Anglophone public schools:
 Laurentian Regional High School in Lachute

References

External links

Incorporated places in Outaouais
Municipalities in Quebec